Thrasher is a fictional character from the G.I. Joe: A Real American Hero toyline, comic books and animated series. He is affiliated with Cobra as the Dreadnoks' Thunder Machine driver and debuted in 1986.

Profile
Thrasher was spoiled as a child by his middle-class parents, who never disciplined him in fear that this would "stifle energies he might need later in life". They never denied him anything he asked for, no matter how many times those things wound up causing some type of destruction or major disaster. After his parents were crippled in a car wreck, which may or may not have had anything to do with Thrasher's repair work on their brakes, this "wild child" wandered into the swamps where he could do what he pleased. There he met Zartan and the Dreadnoks, who welcomed him in as one of them. But even by Dreadnok standards, Thrasher is pretty low, almost deriving pleasure from inflicting misery and suffering on others.

Toys
Thrasher was first released as an action figure in 1986, packaged with the Dreadnok Thunder Machine.

Comics

Marvel Comics
In the Marvel Comics G.I. Joe series, he first appeared in issue #51. According to dialogue, he had wandered off into the swamps some time ago. He returns because the swamp held nothing left to smash. Further more, the pollution had killed off all the wild animals so there was nothing left to strangle. Later, in a conflict with the Joes, he purposely drives the Thunder Machine through a moving train, using the guns to create a hole.

In issue #69, Thrasher, Monkeywrench and Zarana had been part of a team overseeing a Cobra Terror Drome base in the fictional country of Sierra Gordo.

When the country erupts in civil war, the three take Thrasher's Thunder Machine to a local airstrip. They take several civilians hostage. This gets them transport from Wild Bill, Crazylegs and Maverick of the G.I. Joe team. Eventually the Dreadnoks, Joes and the civilians willingly work together in an attempt to escape to safety. Thrasher is injured during this attempt; eventually everyone makes it out alive.

During the Cobra Civil War, the Dreadnoks sided with Cobra Commander (in reality, the Crimson Guardsman Fred VII, who was impersonating Cobra Commander) against Serpentor. A new Thunder Machine served as Fred's transport during the conflict. While fellow Dreadnok Buzzer was fighting G.I. Joe general Hawk on top of the Thunder Machine, Thrasher crashed it into Destro's personal D.E.M.O.N. tank, locking bumpers. After the Thunder Machine was evacuated, Destro ordered the D.E.M.O.N. to fire on it, freeing the vehicle but knocking it over. Thrasher used Monkeywrench's grenades to upright it, a decision he later regretted; while the vehicle remained structurally sound, its engine was damaged, although it remained operational enough to return Fred back to his troops.

Later, he battles G.I. Joe soldiers and their sub-team Battleforce 2000. In the first battle his Thunder Machine is destroyed by Joe equipment. In the second battle, Thrasher and the Dreadnoks only escaped due to interference from the local police.

Devil's Due
As seen in the Devil's Due series, he stays with the Dreadnoks as it turns into a multi-state operation. Joe forces assault the Dreadnoks' Florida Everglades headquarters. Thrasher and Buzzer flee in the Thunder Machine, are run off a hidden road by Joe forces and left behind. Later, he teams up with Buzzer, Ripper and Road Pig to supervise the purchase of a nuclear weapon from Russian forces. Thrasher is entrusted with the supervision of the Montreal, Quebec, Canada chapter of the Dreadnoks; most of the gang's power structure had retreated to this city after the Everglades raid.

IDW
Thrasher is younger in this continuity. He is a stable technological genius, maintaining a Dreadnok camp deep in the Australian outback. He is loyal to Zartan to the point of betraying other Dreadnoks. However Zartan betrays him as soon as it is beneficial.

Animated series

Sunbow
He first appeared in the G.I. Joe second-season episode "Arise, Serpentor, Arise!: Pt. 1". He attempts to earn a spot on the Dreadnoks as he uses the Thunder Machine to pursue Joes Sgt. Slaughter, Beach Head and Low-Light. Thrasher joins the Dreadnoks afterwards, much to the disgust of the other members.

Thrasher was voiced by Ted Schwartz.

G.I. Joe: The Movie
Thrasher also appeared briefly in the 1987 animated film G.I. Joe: The Movie. In one scene, he teases a woman named "Heather" as she is changing out of her dress. "Heather" then throws him into a nearby lake and reveals herself as Zarana in disguise.

Other works
Thrasher's figure is briefly featured in the fiction novel 6 Sick Hipsters. In the story, the character Paul Achting spent four years collecting G.I. Joe figures to set up a battle scene between the Joes and Cobra. As he imagined the characters in his head, he described the Dreadnoks as "an elite team of maniacal mercenaries allied with Cobra for this battle", with the figures lying in the thick of the shag carpet, and Thrasher as "the psycho, mounted on the Thunder Machine, a red and black behemoth that was as postapocalyptic as Mad Max himself".

References

Comics characters introduced in 1986
Dreadnoks
Fictional drivers
Fictional henchmen
Male characters in animated series
Male characters in comics
Villains in animated television series